C.J. Binks (Christopher John) is a Tasmanian writer.

He has lived in Tasmania since the 1940s

His interest in Western Tasmania led him to write Explorers of Western Tasmania a significant history of exploration of the region, another Pioneers of the West Coast and a later work Hills of the West Wind

He has also written about Bass Strait and Devonport

Notes

Living people
20th-century births
Western Tasmania
Writers from Tasmania
Year of birth missing (living people)